The 1983 NCAA Division I-AA Football Championship Game was a postseason college football game between the Southern Illinois Salukis and the Western Carolina Catamounts. The game was played on December 17, 1983, at Johnson Hagood Stadium in Charleston, South Carolina. The culminating game of the 1983 NCAA Division I-AA football season, it was won by Southern Illinois, 43–7.

Teams
The participants of the Championship Game were the finalists of the 1983 I-AA Playoffs, which began with a 12-team bracket.

Southern Illinois Salukis

Southern Illinois finished their regular season with a 10–1 record (5–1 in conference); their only loss was to Wichita State in their final regular season game. Ranked first in the final NCAA I-AA in-house poll and seeded first in the tournament, the Salukis received a first-round bye then defeated Indiana State and Nevada to reach the final. This was the first appearance for Southern Illinois in a Division I-AA championship game.

Western Carolina Catamounts

Western Carolina finished their regular season with an 8–2–1 record (5–0–1 in conference); their two losses were to Division I-A programs, Clemson and Wake Forest; the tie came against conference rival Furman. Ranked ninth in the final NCAA I-AA in-house poll and unseeded in the tournament, the Catamounts defeated Colgate, second-seed Holy Cross, and third-seed Furman to reach the final. This was also the first appearance for Western Carolina in a Division I-AA championship game.

Game summary
After a scoreless first quarter, Southern Illinois took a 10–0 lead into halftime, then broke the game open with 23 unanswered points in the third quarter. The Salukis' defense intercepted seven passes, with four of the interceptions made by safety Greg Shipp.

Scoring summary

Game statistics

References

Further reading

 
Championship Game
NCAA Division I Football Championship Games
Southern Illinois Salukis football games
Western Carolina Catamounts football games
American football in South Carolina
Sports in Charleston, South Carolina
NCAA Division I-AA Football Championship Game
NCAA Division I-AA Football Championship Game
Sports competitions in South Carolina
Events in Charleston, South Carolina